Meaher State Park is a public recreation area located on Big Island, an island at the north end of Mobile Bay that lies within the city limits of Spanish Fort, Alabama. The state park occupies  along the shoreline of Ducker Bay,  at the junction of Mobile Bay and the Mobile-Tensaw River Delta. It is surrounded by wetlands of the Mobile Bay estuary. The park is accessed from Battleship Parkway, known locally as the "Causeway," and is managed by Alabama Department of Conservation and Natural Resources.

History
The park opened in 1989. The land was donated to the state for public recreational use by Augustine Meaher, for whom the park is named. Augustine Meaher was a descendant of Timothy Meaher, who illegally smuggled 110 West African slaves into Mobile Bay on the schooner Clotilda in 1860. He was charged with smuggling but was not convicted.

Awards
In September 2020, Meaher State Park was one of eleven Alabama State Parks awarded Tripadvisor’s Traveler’s Choice Award, which recognizes businesses and attractions that earn consistently high user reviews.

Activities and amenities
The park features an interpretive boardwalk through the wetlands, picnic area, boat ramp, fishing pier, two cabins, and a camping area with 56 individual campsites.

References

External links
Meaher State Park Alabama Department of Conservation and Natural Resources

State parks of Alabama
Protected areas of Baldwin County, Alabama
Mobile Bay
Protected areas established in 1989
1989 establishments in Alabama